Little Pigeon River or Little Pigeon Creek is a stream located in northwestern Spencer County and northeastern Warrick County, Indiana.  The 1,000 acre watershed feeds marshland which, when the stream is high, provides a good habitat for ducks. It was the site of the Little Pigeon Creek Community, Abraham Lincoln's Indiana boyhood home, now the Lincoln Boyhood National Memorial.

Alternate names include:
 Little Pigeon
 North Fork Little Pigeon Creek
 Pigeon Branch

See also
 List of rivers of Indiana
 Lincoln Boyhood National Memorial, part of the Little Pigeon Creek settlement

References

External links
 Little Pigeon Creek families with the Lincoln family

Rivers of Indiana
Rivers of Spencer County, Indiana
Rivers of Warrick County, Indiana